Mariucci may refer to:

People
John Mariucci, Ice hockey player and coach
Steve Mariucci, American football coach

Other
Mariucci Arena
Mariucci Classic